The 1976 NCAA Division II football rankings are from the Associated Press. This is for the 1976 NCAA Division II football season.

Legend

Associated Press poll

Notes

References

Rankings
NCAA Division II football rankings